William R. Horton (born August 12, 1951), commonly referred to as "Willie Horton", is an American convicted felon who became notorious for committing violent crimes while on furlough from prison, where he was serving a life sentence without the possibility of parole for murder. Released for a weekend as the beneficiary of a Massachusetts furlough program, he failed to return, and was later recaptured and convicted of committing assault, armed robbery, and rape in Maryland, where he remains incarcerated.

The controversy over Horton's furlough became a major issue in the 1988 presidential election, as US Vice President and Republican nominee George H. W. Bush brought Horton up frequently during his campaign against Massachusetts governor and Democratic nominee Michael Dukakis. He was commonly referred to as "Willie" Horton, despite never having gone by the nickname. The re-naming of the African-American Horton has been speculated to be the product of racist stereotyping. A prominent PAC ad for Bush about Horton has been widely characterized as a textbook example of dog-whistle politics.

Criminal activity and incarceration
On October 26, 1974, in Lawrence, Massachusetts, Horton and two accomplices robbed Joseph Fournier, a white 17-year-old gas station attendant, and then fatally stabbed Fournier 19 times after he had cooperated by handing over all of the money in the cash register. His body was stuffed in a trash can, so his feet were jammed up against his chin. Fournier died from blood loss. Horton was convicted of murder, sentenced to life imprisonment without the possibility of parole, and incarcerated at the Northeastern Correctional Center in Massachusetts.

On June 6, 1986, Horton was released as part of a weekend furlough program but did not return. On April 3, 1987, in Oxon Hill, Maryland, Horton twice raped a woman after pistol-whipping, stabbing, binding, and gagging her fiancé. He then stole the car belonging to the man he had assaulted. He was later shot by Corporal Paul J. Lopez of the Prince George's County Police Department and captured by Corporal Yusuf A. Muhammad of the same department after a pursuit. On October 20, Horton was sentenced in Maryland to two consecutive life terms plus 85 years. The sentencing judge, Vincent J. Femia, refused to return Horton to Massachusetts, saying, "I'm not prepared to take the chance that Mr. Horton might again be furloughed or otherwise released. This man should never draw a breath of free air again."

Legislative and political background
Democratic presidential candidate Michael Dukakis was the governor of Massachusetts at the time of Horton's release. While he did not start the furlough program, he had supported it as a method of criminal rehabilitation. The state inmate furlough program, originally signed into law by Republican governor Francis Sargent in 1972, excluded convicted first-degree murderers. However, in 1973, the Massachusetts Supreme Judicial Court ruled that this right extended to first-degree murderers because the law specifically did not exclude them. The Massachusetts legislature quickly passed a bill prohibiting furloughs for such inmates. However, in 1976, Dukakis vetoed this bill, arguing it would "cut the heart out of efforts at inmate rehabilitation."

The program remained in effect through the intervening term of Governor Edward J. King, and was abolished during Dukakis' final term of office on April 28, 1988, after Dukakis had decided to run for president. This abolition occurred only after the Lawrence Eagle-Tribune had run 175 stories about the furlough program and won a Pulitzer Prize.

Horton in the 1988 presidential campaign

The first person to mention the Massachusetts furlough program in the 1988 presidential campaign was Democratic Senator Al Gore. During a debate before the New York primary, Gore took issue with the furlough program. However, he did not mention the Horton incident or even his name, instead asking a general question about the program.

Republicans eagerly picked up the Horton issue after Dukakis won the Democratic nomination. In June 1988, Republican candidate George H.W. Bush seized on the Horton case, bringing it up repeatedly in campaign speeches. Bush's campaign manager Lee Atwater said: "By the time we're finished, they're going to wonder whether Willie Horton is Dukakis's running mate."

Campaign staffer James Pinkerton returned with reams of material that Atwater told him to reduce to a  index card, telling him, "I'm giving you one thing: You can use both sides of the 3×5 card." Pinkerton discovered the furlough issue by watching the Felt Forum debate. On May 25, 1988, Republican consultants met in Paramus, New Jersey, holding a focus group of "Reagan Democrats" who had voted for Ronald Reagan in 1984. These focus groups convinced Atwater and the other Republican consultants that they should 'go negative' against Dukakis. Further information regarding the furlough came from aide Andrew Card, a Massachusetts native whom President George W. Bush later named as his Chief of Staff.

Over the Fourth of July weekend in 1988, Atwater attended a motorcyclists' convention in Luray, Virginia. Two couples talked about the Horton story featured in the July issue of Reader's Digest. Atwater joined them without mentioning who he was. Later that night, a focus group in Alabama had turned completely against Dukakis when presented the information about Horton's furlough. Atwater used this occurrence to argue the necessity of pounding Dukakis about the furlough issue.

Fall campaign
Beginning on September 21, 1988, the Americans for Bush arm of the National Security Political Action Committee (NSPAC), under the auspices of Floyd Brown, began running a campaign ad entitled "Weekend Passes," using the Horton case to attack Dukakis. The ad was produced by media consultant Larry McCarthy, who had previously worked for Roger Ailes. After clearing the ad with television stations, McCarthy added a mug shot of Horton. The ad was run as an independent expenditure, separate from the Bush campaign, which claimed not to have had any role in its production. The ad referred to Horton as "Willie", although he later said he had always gone by William:

The fact is, my name is not 'Willie.' It's part of the myth of the case. The name irks me. It was created to play on racial stereotypes: big, ugly, dumb, violent, black — 'Willie.' I resent that. They created a fictional character — who seemed believable but did not exist. They stripped me of my identity, distorted the facts, and robbed me of my constitutional rights.

On October 5, 1988, a day after the "Weekend Passes" ad was taken off the airwaves and the day of the Bentsen–Quayle debate, the Bush campaign ran its ad, "Revolving Door," which also attacked Dukakis over the weekend furlough program. While the advertisement did not mention Horton or feature his photograph, it depicted a variety of men walking in and out of prison through a revolving door.

The controversy escalated when vice presidential candidate Lloyd Bentsen and former Democratic presidential candidate and civil rights leader Jesse Jackson called the "Revolving Door" ad racist, a charge which was denied by Bush and campaign staff.

Throughout most of the campaign, the Horton ad was seen as focusing on criminal justice issues, with neither the candidates nor journalists mentioning a racial component. However, near the end of the presidential campaign—on October 21, 1988—Democratic primary runner-up Jesse Jackson accused the ad's creators of playing upon presumed fears of some voters, in particular those harboring stereotyped fears of blacks as criminals. From that point on, race was a substantial part of the media coverage of the ad itself and the campaign. Some candidates continued to deny it, and most commentators at the time felt it was not. Academics have noted that the alleged racial overtone of the ad was a key aspect of the way the ad was remembered and later studied.

On October 22, in an attempt to counter-attack, Dukakis's campaign ran an ad about a convicted heroin dealer named Angel Medrano who raped and killed a pregnant mother of two after escaping from a federal correctional halfway house.

In 1990, the Ohio Democratic Party and a group called "Black Elected Democrats of Ohio" filed a complaint with the Federal Election Commission alleging that NSPAC had coordinated or cooperated with the Bush campaign in airing the ad, which would make it an illegal in-kind campaign contribution. The investigation by the FEC, including deposition of officials from both organizations, revealed indirect connections between McCarthy and the Bush campaign (such as his having previously worked for Ailes) but found no direct evidence of wrongdoing. The investigation reached an impasse and was eventually closed with no finding of any violation of campaign finance laws.

Robin Toner of The New York Times wrote in 1990 that Republicans and Democrats, while disagreeing on the merits of the ad itself, agreed it was "devastating to Dukakis." Dukakis said in 2012 that while he initially tried to ignore the ad during the 1988 campaign, two months later he "realized that I was getting killed with this stuff."

In December 2018, after Bush's death, the ad was again highlighted by political commentators. Ann Coulter described his Willie Horton ad as "the greatest campaign commercial in political history," claiming that it "clearly and forcefully highlighted the two presidential candidates' diametrically opposed views" on crime. Many other commentators have remarked that the Bush presidency, back to the campaign's Horton advertisement, stoked racial animosity, and suggested the ad itself was race-baiting, as Horton's race is still a key part of public awareness of the ad.

See also

Revolving Door (advertisement)
Daisy (advertisement)
Swiftboating
Wayne DuMond
Maurice Clemmons

References

External links
 
 
 
 

1951 births
1974 murders in the United States
1987 crimes in the United States
1988 in politics
African-American people
American people convicted of assault
American people convicted of murder
American prisoners sentenced to life imprisonment
American rapists
American robbers
Criminals from Massachusetts
George H. W. Bush administration controversies
Living people
People convicted of murder by Massachusetts
People from Chesterfield, South Carolina
Political campaign advertisements
Prisoners sentenced to life imprisonment by Maryland
Prisoners sentenced to life imprisonment by Massachusetts
1988 United States presidential election